Barham is a town in the western Riverina district of New South Wales, Australia. The town is located 823 kilometres south west of the state capital, Sydney and  303 kilometres north west of Melbourne. The town is in the Murray River Council local government area.

History
For thousands of years before white explorers arrived, the Barababaraba people camped, hunted fished and gardened here. Their cooking mounds, scar trees, middens and artefacts can readily be found on private land and throughout the forests.  Each nomadic clan had their own territory with exclusive rights to the camping, fishing and hunting. There was some vigorous resistance to the first settlers, but the indigenous population dramatically decreased in the late 1800s, mainly due to disease.

The history of white settlement begins in 1843 when the 114,656 acre 'Barham' station was taken up by Edward Green, who named it after the maiden name of his wife.  The south bank of the Murray was then settled towards the end of the Victorian gold rush where squatters grazed sheep & cattle. The typical Australian struggle between squatters (on vast acreage) and selectors (who took up small lots) was played out throughout the district, with selectors such as Parkman, McConnell and Hudson moving in to take up small farms within the Barham station lease from 1877.

The Post Office opened on 1 January 1895. Growth was slow until 1904 with the construction of a lift span bridge designed to allow paddle steamers through.

Heritage listings 
Barham has a number of heritage-listed sites, including:
 319 Main Road: Barham Bridge over Murray River

Also of historic and architectural interest in Barham are the Royal Hotel (1904) and the National Bank building (1912).

Timber industry 

From the early 1870s, timber cutters began to set up camps and log the River Red Gums (Eucalyptus camaldulensis) that grow in the surrounding forests. Koondrook, on the Victorian side, developed more quickly than Barham, soon becoming the centre of a large forest industry with the timber being used to build boats & paddle steamers. Some of these boats are still operating, the paddle steamer Melbourne, built at Koondrook in 1914 is a tourist attraction at Mildura, the Alexander Arbuthnot, built in 1923, & the Emmylou built in 1980-1982 operate in Echuca. The timber industry has continued to supply building timber, garden timber and firewood with several sawmills operating in the area. The Bonum Sawmill, occupying land at the Northern edge of Barham, incorporated several significant value-adding enterprises, such as a kiln, veneering and finger-jointing before closing in 2010 when the New South Wales government closed access to many of the forest areas following many years of drought and poor tree growth.

Barham Bridge 

Barham's development was aided when a lift span bridge across the river opened in 1904, designed by Ernest de Burgh of the Department of Public Works and constructed by Monash & Anderson, with John Monash in charge. The bridge replaced a punt that was used to ferry people, stock and goods across the river, and allowed road access between the Riverina and the Victorian markets, while permitting the passage of paddle steamers when the middle section was raised. Until it was motorised in 1997 it was operated by a system of weights worked by two men turning wheels. The span is still occasionally raised. The bridge is now one of the oldest remaining across the Murray River. A similar bridge was constructed upstream at the same time between Cobram, Victoria and Barooga, New South Wales.

Agriculture 

The region boasts a rich agriculture based on irrigation including rice, sheep, citrus, cereal crops, dairy, walnuts, olives, and beef cattle.

The town today
The major industries in and around Barham are agriculture, including dairying and citrus, and forestry.  Like much of the southern Riverina, the town is attuned culturally to Victoria, reading Victorian newspapers and watching Victorian television channels.  The most popular team sport is Australian rules football, the town in conjunction with neighbouring township Koondrook across the Murray having an Australian Rules football team competing in the Central Murray Football League.

Golfers play at the Barham Golf and Country Club on Moulamein Road.

Population
In the 2016 Census, there were 1,159 people in Barham. 83.5% of people were born in Australia and 89.9% of people only spoke English at home. The most common responses for religion were Anglican 28.6%, No Religion 24.4% and Catholic 18.1%.

Notable people
Barham is the birthplace of Australian cyclist Michael Rogers and Danny Lolicato Victorian Young Engineer of the year 2017.

References

External links

Murray River Council - Official site
Koondrook-Barham Bridge - Local Newspaper
Walkabout website - Tourist information
Barham Lakes Caravan Park website - Tourist Park and Accommodation

Towns in the Riverina
Towns in New South Wales
Populated places on the Murray River
Murray River Council